How Do You Feel Now? is the debut studio album by American indie rock band Joywave, released through Cultco Music and Hollywood Records on April 21, 2015. The album is a follow-up to the band's second extended play, How Do You Feel?, which was released earlier in 2014. It was co-produced by band members Daniel Armbruster and Sean Donnelly and was recorded during 2013 and 2014. Four official singles have been released from the album: "Tongues", "Somebody New", "Destruction", and "Now".

Track listing

Releases
The song "Tongues" featuring KOPPS is included in the soundtrack of the EA Sports video game FIFA 15.

"Somebody New" is featured in the Konami video game Pro Evolution Soccer 2016.

Charts

References

2015 debut albums
Joywave albums
Hollywood Records albums
Indie pop albums by American artists